Yelyzaveta Samadova-Ruban (born 3 March 1995) is a Ukrainian-born Azerbaijani volleyball player who plays for CSM Lugoj and Azerbaijan women's national volleyball team as an outside spiker.

Career
Originally from Ukraine, Samadova started her professional career at Rabita Baku in 2014. During the 2016-17 season, she was the captain of Telekom Baku and won the championship in Azerbaijani Super League and became the MVP of the season. In summer of 2017, she transferred to the Italian Serie A1 team, Pallavolo Scandicci. In summer of 2018, she transferred to the Russian Superleague team, Leningradka Saint-Petersburg .

National team
Samadova made her debut for Azerbaijani senior team in 2015. She helped her team earn gold at the 2016 Women's European Volleyball League and 2017 Islamic Solidarity Games. She also played for Azerbaijan in the 2017 Women's European Volleyball Championship and reached the semifinals.

Personal life
Samadova is dating Jovan Krneta, Serbian professional football player who currently plays for Zira FK in Azerbaijani Premier League.

References

External links
 
CEV profile
Eurosport profile
Leningradka profile

1995 births
Living people
Sportspeople from Kyiv
Ukrainian women's volleyball players
Azerbaijani women's volleyball players
Ukrainian emigrants to Azerbaijan
Naturalized citizens of Azerbaijan
Expatriate volleyball players in Italy
Outside hitters
Azerbaijani expatriate sportspeople in Italy
Azerbaijani expatriate sportspeople in Russia
Azerbaijani expatriate sportspeople in Turkey
Azerbaijani expatriate sportspeople in Romania
Expatriate volleyball players in Romania
Expatriate volleyball players in Turkey
Expatriate volleyball players in Russia